Panjakent, or Penjikent is a city in the Sughd province of Tajikistan on the river Zeravshan, with a population of 52,500 (2020 estimate). It was once an ancient town in Sogdiana. The ruins of the old town are on the outskirts of the modern city. The Sarazm Important Bird Area lies downstream of the city on the tugay-vegetated floodplain of the river.

History
Ancient Panjakent was a small but flourishing town of the Sogdians in pre-Islamic Central Asia. It was known as Panchekanth. It means five towns (villages) in Persian. The ethnic and territorial name "Soghd/Soghdian" or Sughd/Sughdian was mentioned in history as early as the Iranian Achaemenid dynasty (6th century BC). The Achaemenids founded several city-states, as well as cities along the ancient Silk road and in the Zarafshan valley.

The town grew in the 5th century AD and many professionals such as established businessmen and landowners made their livelihoods in Panjakent. In AD 722, Arab Muslims forces besieged and took the town. The last ruler of the town Divashtich fled into upper Zarafshan but he was captured and sentenced to death. For around 50 years, ancient Panjakent was ruled by new administrators but towards the end of the 8th century the town on the upper terraces was depopulated and relocated. Many ancient ruins of the old city, particularly the city architecture and works of art remain today.

Numerous records of a Penjikent rulership, written in Sogdian, were located not far of Penjikent on Mount Mug. Through their reading of these texts, the public of Central Asia in the 8th century will judge on social, economic and political life.

According to Arab geographers, Panjakent in the 10th century had a formal Friday mosque that distinguished the place as a town from a village. It was the easternmost city of Soghd, and became well known for its walnuts.

Russian archaeologist Boris Marshak spent more than fifty years excavating the ruins at Panjakent. He remained there even after Tajik independence as director of the excavation of the Panjakent ruins, during the years of Civil War in Tajikistan from 1992 to 1997. Through close cooperation with the government of Tajikistan, Marshak ensured the protection and continued excavation of the Panjakent ruins.

Ancient murals and artifacts

Numerous murals were recovered from the site of Panjikent, and many of them are now on display in the Hermitage Museum and in the National Museum of Antiquities of Tajikistan in Dushanbe. A great variety influences are visible in the paintings, which show details of dress and daily life: Greek decorative styles encounter the Iranian narratives of the Shahnameh and the epic cycle of Rostam, scenes of festivities alternate with depictions of combats, local cults mix with Iranian and Indian deities. Shaivism was popular in Sogdiana and Eastern Turkestan as found from the wall painting from Penjikent on the river Zervashan. In this depiction, Shiva is portrayed with a sacred halo and a sacred thread ("Yajnopavita"). He is clad in a tigerskin while his attendants are wearing Sogdian dress. There is a depiction of him four-legged seated cross-legged on a cushioned seat supported by two bulls.

The production of paintings started in the 5th century AD and stopped in 722 AD with the invasion of the Abbasid Caliphate, and many works of art were damaged or destroyed at that time.

Geography

Climate
Panjakent has a hot summer humid continental climate (Köppen climate classification Dsa). The average annual temperature is 10.7 °C (51.3 °F). The warmest month is July with an average temperature of 22.8 °C (73 °F) and the coolest month is January with an average temperature of −1.6 °C (29.1 °F). The average annual precipitation is 468.5mm (18.4") and has an average of 87.9 days with precipitation. The wettest month is April with an average of 94mm (3.7") of precipitation and the driest month is August with an average of 2.6mm (0.1") of precipitation.

Subdivisions
Before ca. 2018, Panjakent was the seat of Panjakent District, which covered the rural part of the present city of Panjakent. The city of Panjakent covers Panjakent proper and fourteen jamoats. These are as follows:

Notable people

Nigina Amonkulova, folk singer
Khayrinisso Yusufi, vice-premier of Tajikistan, member of the Assembly of Representatives.
 Otakhon Latifi (1936–1998), was a noted journalist and politician
 Yaqub Beg, leader of Uighur state of Yettishar during the Dungan Revolt against the Qing dynasty in years 1865–1877

See also
 List of cities in Tajikistan

Notes

References

External links

 

Populated places in Sughd Region
Achaemenid cities
Former populated places in Tajikistan
Samarkand Oblast
Sogdian cities